Gennaro Fragiello (born March 30, 1984 in Naples) is an Italian professional football player.

He played 2 games in 2 seasons in the Serie A for Bologna F.C. 1909.

See also
Football in Italy
List of football clubs in Italy

References

External links
 

1984 births
Living people
Italian footballers
Serie A players
Serie B players
Bologna F.C. 1909 players
Footballers from Naples
U.S. Sassuolo Calcio players
A.S. Sambenedettese players
U.S. Salernitana 1919 players
Como 1907 players
A.S.D. Cassino Calcio 1924 players
Association football forwards
A.S.D. Fanfulla players